The  is a national expressway on the island of Honshū in Japan. It is operated by Central Nippon Expressway Company. The expressway is designated as E1 under the "2016 Proposal for Realization of Expressway Numbering", because it parallels National Route 1. It is a part of the Asian Highway Network.

Naming
The word Tōmei is an acronym consisting of two kanji characters.

Officially the expressway is designated as the First Tōkai Expressway. A second Tōkai Expressway (operating as the Shin-Tōmei Expressway) is under construction parallel to the existing route, and is intended to alleviate congestion problems in the near term.

The expressway is also a part of Route AH1 of the Asian Highway Network.

Overview 
The Tōmei Expressway is an important roadway linking Tokyo and Nagoya. It is the most heavily travelled roadway operated by Central Nippon Expressway Company, with some sections used by more than 100,000 vehicles a day.

The first sections were opened to traffic in 1968 and the entire route was completed in 1969.

From the origin in western Tokyo the expressway follows a westerly route through Kanagawa Prefecture, paralleling National Route 246 and passing to the north of Yokohama. The route continues west into Shizuoka Prefecture, passing to the south of Mount Fuji and along the coastline of Suruga Bay, paralleling National Route 1 and the historic Tōkaidō highway before reaching the city of Shizuoka. The expressway continues west, passing Lake Hamana in western Shizuoka Prefecture, and crosses into Aichi Prefecture. The expressway then heads northwest, passing to the east of the city of Nagoya and meeting the terminus of the Chūō Expressway before terminating at an interchange in the city of Komaki to the north of Nagoya. Although the Tōmei Expressway ends at this point, the roadway continues as the Meishin Expressway towards Kyoto, Osaka, and Kobe.

List of interchanges and features 

 IC - interchange, SIC - smart interchange, JCT - junction, SA - service area, PA - parking area, BS - bus stop, TN - tunnel, TB - toll gate, BR - bridge

{|class="wikitable"
|-
!style="border-bottom:3px solid green;"|No.
!style="border-bottom:3px solid green;"|Name
!style="border-bottom:3px solid green;"|Connections
!style="border-bottom:3px solid green;"|Dist. fromOrigin
!style="border-bottom:3px solid green;"|Bus Stop
!style="border-bottom:3px solid green;"|Notes
!colspan="2" style="border-bottom:3px solid green;"|Location
|-
|colspan="8" style="text-align: center; background:#dff9f9;"|Through to  Shuto Expressway Shibuya Route
|-
!style="background-color: #BFB;"|1
|Tokyo IC
|Met. Route 311 (Kampachi-dori Ave.)
|style="text-align: center;"|0.0
|style="text-align: center;"|
|
|rowspan="3"|Setagaya
|rowspan="3" style="width:1em;"|Tokyo
|-
!style="background-color: #BFB;"|-
|style="background-color: #ffdead;"|Tōmei JCT
|style="background-color: #ffdead;"| Tokyo Gaikan Expressway
|style="text-align: center; background-color: #ffdead;"|↓
|style="text-align: center; background-color: #ffdead;"|
|style="background-color: #ffdead;"|Planned
|-
!rowspan="2" style="background-color: #BFB;"|BR
|rowspan="2" |Tamagawa Bridge
|rowspan="2" |
|rowspan="2" style="text-align: center;"|↓
|rowspan="2" style="text-align: center;"|
|rowspan="2" |Tama River crossing
|-
|rowspan="2"|Tama-ku, Kawasaki
|rowspan="30" style="width:1em;"|Kanagawa
|-
!style="background-color: #BFB;"|-
|style="background-color:#ffdead;"|Shukugawara JCT
|style="background-color:#ffdead;"| Shuto Expressway Kawasaki Route
|style="text-align: center; background-color:#ffdead;"|↓
|style="text-align: center; background-color:#ffdead;"|
|style="background-color:#ffdead;"|Planned
|-
!style="background-color: #BFB;"|TB
|Tokyo Toll Gate/Mukaigaoka Bus Stop
|
|style="text-align: center;"|6.7
|style="text-align: center;"|○
|
|rowspan="2"|Miyamae-ku, Kawasaki
|-
!style="background-color: #BFB;"|3
|Tōmei-Kawasaki IC
|
|style="text-align: center;"|7.6
|style="text-align: center;"|
|
|-
!style="background-color: #BFB;"|BS
|Eda Bus Stop
|
|style="text-align: center;"|10.5
|style="text-align: center;"|○
|
|rowspan="2"|Aoba-ku, Yokohama
|-
!style="background-color: #BFB;"|3-1
|Yokohama-Aoba IC
| Shuto Expressway Yokohama Northwest Route
|style="text-align: center;"|13.3
|style="text-align: center;"|
|
|-
!style="background-color: #BFB;"|PA
|Kōhoku PA
|
|style="text-align: center;"|14.2
|style="text-align: center;"|
|
|rowspan="2"|Midori-ku, Yokohama
|-
!style="background-color: #BFB;"|4
|Yokohama-Machida IC/Yokohama Bus Stop
| National Route 16 (Yamato Bypass) National Route 246 Hodogaya Bypass
|style="text-align: center;"|19.7
|style="text-align: center;"|X
|Bus Stop closed
|-
!style="background-color: #BFB;"|BS
|Yamato Bus Stop
|
|style="text-align: center;"|24.0
|style="text-align: center;"|○
|
|rowspan="2"|Yamato
|-
!style="background-color: #BFB;"|TN
|Yamato Tunnel
|
|style="text-align: center;"|↓
|style="text-align: center;"|
|
|-
!style="background-color: #BFB;"|BS
|Ayase Bus Stop
|
|style="text-align: center;"|28.8
|style="text-align: center;"|○
|
|rowspan="2"|Ayase
|-
!style="background-color: #BFB;"|-
|style="background-color:#ffdead;"|Ayase SIC
|style="background-color:#ffdead;"|Pref. Route 42 (Fujisawa Zama Atsugi Route)
|style="text-align: center; background-color:#ffdead;"|33.9
|style="text-align: center; background-color:#ffdead;"|
|style="background-color:#ffdead;"|Planned
|-
!style="background-color: #BFB;"|SA
|Ebina SA
|
|style="text-align: center;"|31.3
|style="text-align: center;"|
|
|rowspan="2"|Ebina
|-
!style="background-color: #BFB;"|4-1
|Ebina JCT
|| Ken-Ō Expressway
|style="text-align: center;"|33.9
|style="text-align: center;"|
|-
!style="background-color: #BFB;"|5
|Atsugi IC
| Odawara-Atsugi Road National Route 129 National Route 246
|style="text-align: center;"|35.0
|style="text-align: center;"|
|
|rowspan="2"|Atsugi
|-
!style="background-color: #BFB;"|BS
|Atsugi Bus Stop
|
|style="text-align: center;"|36.7
|style="text-align: center;"|○
|
|-
!style="background-color: #BFB;"|5-1
|style="background-color:"|Isehara JCT
|style="background-color:"| Shin-Tōmei Expressway
|style="text-align: center;"|40.0
|style="text-align: center;"|
|style="background-color:"|
|rowspan="2"|Isehara
|-
!style="background-color: #BFB;"|BS
|Isehara Bus Stop
|
|style="text-align: center;"|41.7
|style="text-align: center;"|○
|
|-
!style="background-color: #BFB;"|5-2
|Hadano-Nakai IC/Hadano Bus Stop
|Pref. Route 71 (Hadano Ninomiya Route) Atsugi-Hadano Road (Planned)
|style="text-align: center;"|50.1
|style="text-align: center;"|○
|
|Hadano
|-
!style="background-color: #BFB;"|PA
|Nakai PA
|
|style="text-align: center;"|53.6
|style="text-align: center;"|
|
|Nakai
|-
!style="background-color: #BFB;"|BS
|Ōi Bus Stop
|
|style="text-align: center;"|57.1
|style="text-align: center;"|○
|
|rowspan="2"|Ōi
|-
!style="background-color: #BFB;"|6
|Ōi-Matsuda IC
|| National Route 246 National Route 255Pref. Route 78 (Gotenba Ōi Route)
|style="text-align: center;"|57.9
|style="text-align: center;"|
|
|-
!style="background-color: #BFB;"|BS
|Matsuda Bus Stop
|
|style="text-align: center;"|60.2
|style="text-align: center;"|○
|
|Matsuda
|-
!style="background-color: #BFB;"|BS
|Yamakita Bus Stop
|
|style="text-align: center;"|63.6
|style="text-align: center;"|○
|
|rowspan="7"|Yamakita
|-
!style="background-color: #BFB;"|TN
|Azumayama Tunnel
|
|style="text-align: center;"|↓
|style="text-align: center;"|
|
|-
!style="background-color: #BFB;"|TN
|Shintsuburano Tunnel (Komaki-bound)Tsuburano Tunnel (Tokyo-bound)
|
|style="text-align: center;"|↓
|style="text-align: center;"|
|
|-
!style="background-color: #BFB;"|TN
|Torideyama Tunnel
|
|style="text-align: center;"|↓
|style="text-align: center;"|
|rowspan="3"|Tokyo-bound only
|-
!style="background-color: #BFB;"|TN
|Tarogao Tunnel
|
|style="text-align: center;"|↓
|style="text-align: center;"|
|-
!style="background-color: #BFB;"|TN
|Kitahata Tunnel
|
|style="text-align: center;"|↓
|style="text-align: center;"|
|-
!style="background-color: #BFB;"|PA
|Ayuzawa PA
|
|style="text-align: center;"|71.9(↓)72.5(↑)
|style="text-align: center;"|
|Komaki-bound: Accessible only to Left Route
|-
!style="background-color: #BFB;"|TN
|Sakuradaira Tunnel
|
|style="text-align: center;"|↓
|style="text-align: center;"|
|rowspan="2"|Tokyo-bound only
|rowspan="8"|Oyama
|rowspan="64" style="width:1em;"|Shizuoka
|-
!style="background-color: #BFB;"|TN
|Takao Tunnel
|
|style="text-align: center;"|↓
|style="text-align: center;"|
|-
!style="background-color: #BFB;"|BS
|Oyama Bus Stop
|
|style="text-align: center;"|75.5
|style="text-align: center;"|○
|Komaki-bound: Accessible only to Left Route
|-
!style="background-color: #BFB;"|TN
|Shoryo Tunnel
|
|style="text-align: center;"|↓
|style="text-align: center;"|
|rowspan="3"|Tokyo-bound only
|-
!style="background-color: #BFB;"|TN
|Shirahata Tunnel
|
|style="text-align: center;"|↓
|style="text-align: center;"|
|-
!style="background-color: #BFB;"|BR
|Tomei Ashigara Bridge
|
|style="text-align: center;"|
|style="text-align: center;"|
|-
!style="background-color: #BFB;"|BS
|Ashigara Bus Stop
|
|style="text-align: center;"|79.2
|style="text-align: center;"|○
|
|-
!rowspan="2" style="background-color: #BFB;"|SA(6-1)
|rowspan="2" |Ashigara SA/SIC
|rowspan="2" |
|rowspan="2" style="text-align: center;"|80.9
|rowspan="2" style="text-align: center;"|
|rowspan="2" style="text-align: center;"|
|-
|rowspan="5"|Gotemba
|-
!rowspan="2" style="background-color: #BFB;"|7
|Gotemba IC (No.2)
| National Route 138 (Gotemba Bypass)
|rowspan="2" style="text-align: center;"|83.7
|style="text-align: center;"|
|style="background:#ffdddd"|Komaki-bound exit, Tokyo-bound entrance only
|-
|Gotemba IC (No.1)/Gotemba Bus Stop
|Pref. Route 401 (Gotemba Hakone Route)
|style="text-align: center;"|○
|
|-
!style="background-color: #BFB;"|7-1
||Gotemba JCT
|| Shin-Tōmei Expressway
|style="text-align: center;"|88.3
|
|Tokyo-bound only
|-
!style="background-color: #BFB;"|PA(7-2)
|Komakado PA/SIC
|
|style="text-align: center;"|89.9(↓)90.0(↑)
|style="text-align: center;"|X
|Bus Stop closed
|-
!style="background-color: #BFB;"|7-3
|Susono IC
|| National Route 246Pref. Route 82 (Susono Inter Route)
|style="text-align: center;"|93.8
|style="text-align: center;"|
|
|rowspan="2"|Susono
|-
!style="background-color: #BFB;"|BS
|Susono Bus Stop
|
|style="text-align: center;"|95.5
|style="text-align: center;"|○
|
|-
!style="background-color: #BFB;"|8
|Numazu IC
|Pref. Route 83 (Numazu Inter Route) Izu-Jūkan Expressway
|style="text-align: center;"|103.3
|style="text-align: center;"|○
|
|rowspan="3"|Numazu
|-
!style="background-color: #BFB;"|PA(8-1)
|Ashitaka PA/SIC
|
|style="text-align: center;"|105.9
|style="text-align: center;"|○
|
|-
!style="background-color: #BFB;"|BS
|style="background-color:#CCC;"|Hara Bus Stop
|style="background-color:#CCC;"|
|style="text-align: center; background-color:#CCC;"|↓
|style="text-align: center; background-color:#CCC;"|X
|style="background-color:#CCC;"|Closed
|-
!style="background-color: #BFB;"|BS
|Nakazato Bus Stop
|
|style="text-align: center;"|115.7
|style="text-align: center;"|○
|
|rowspan="4"|Fuji
|-
!style="background-color: #BFB;"|9
|Fuji IC
| Nishi-Fuji Road National Route 139Pref. Route 353 (Tagonourakō Fuji Inter Route) Shin-Tōmei Expressway
|style="text-align: center;"|121.5
|style="text-align: center;"|○
|
|-
!style="background-color: #BFB;"|BS
|Matsuoka Bus Stop
|
|style="text-align: center;"|125.0
|style="text-align: center;"|○
|
|-
!style="background-color: #BFB;"|SA(9-1)
|Fujikawa SA/SIC
|Pref. Route 10 (Fujikawa Minobu Route)
|style="text-align: center;"|127.5
|style="text-align: center;"|○
|
|-
!style="background-color: #BFB;"|TN
|Kambara Tunnel
|
|style="text-align: center;"|↓
|style="text-align: center;"|
|Length - 714 m
|rowspan="10"|Shimizu-ku, Shizuoka
|-
!style="background-color: #BFB;"|BS
|Kambara Bus Stop
|
|style="text-align: center;"|133.1
|style="text-align: center;"|○
|
|-
!style="background-color: #BFB;"|PA
|Yui PA
|
|style="text-align: center;"|138.6(↓)139.7(↑)
|style="text-align: center;"|
|
|-
!style="background-color: #BFB;"|TN
|Satta Tunnel
|
|style="text-align: center;"|↓
|
|
|-
!style="background-color: #BFB;"|BS
|Okitsu Bus Stop
|
|style="text-align: center;"|142.5
|style="text-align: center;"|○
|
|-
!style="background-color: #BFB;"|TN
|Okitsu Tunnel
|
|style="text-align: center;"|↓
|
|
|-
!style="background-color: #BFB;"|TN
|Seikenji Tunnel
|
|style="text-align: center;"|↓
|
|
|-
!style="background-color: #BFB;"|TN
|Sodeshi Tunnel
|
|style="text-align: center;"|↓
|
|
|-
!style="background-color: #BFB;"|9-2
|Shimizu JCT
| Shin-Tōmei Expressway
|style="text-align: center;"|146.4
|
|
|-
!style="background-color: #BFB;"|10
|Shimizu IC
| National Route 1 (Seishin Bypass)
|style="text-align: center;"|147.8
|style="text-align: center;"|○
|
|-
!style="background-color: #BFB;"|PA
|Nihondaira PA
|
|style="text-align: center;"|155.8
|style="text-align: center;"|○
|
|rowspan="4"|Suruga-ku, Shizuoka
|-
!style="background-color: #BFB;"|10-1
|Nihondaira-Kunōzan SIC
|
|style="text-align: center;"|158.8
|style="text-align: center;"|
|
|-
!style="background-color: #BFB;"|11
|Shizuoka IC
|Pref. Route 84 (Nakajima Minamiabe Route)
|style="text-align: center;"|161.8
|style="text-align: center;"|○
|
|-
!rowspan="2" style="background-color: #BFB;"|TN
|rowspan="2" |Nihonzaka Tunnel
|rowspan="2" |
|rowspan="2" style="text-align: center;"|↓
|rowspan="2" style="text-align: center;"|
|rowspan="2"|Tokyo-bound Left Route - 2,378 mTokyo-bound Right Route - 2,371 mKomaki-bound - 2,555 m
|-
|rowspan="6"|Yaizu
|-
!style="background-color: #BFB;"|PA
|Nihonzaka PA
|
|style="text-align: center;"|171.5(↓)171.6(↑)
|style="text-align: center;"|
|
|-
!style="background-color: #BFB;"|12
|Yaizu IC
|Pref. Route 81 (Yaizu Mori Route)
|style="text-align: center;"|173.6
|style="text-align: center;"|
|
|-
!style="background-color: #BFB;"|BS
|Yaizu-nishi Bus Stop
|
|style="text-align: center;"|176.1
|style="text-align: center;"|○
|
|-
!style="background-color: #BFB;"|12-1
|Ōigawa-Yaizu-Fujieda SIC
|
|style="text-align: center;"|181.0
|style="text-align: center;"|
|
|-
!style="background-color: #BFB;"|BS
|Ōigawa Bus Stop
|
|style="text-align: center;"|181.0
|style="text-align: center;"|○
|
|-
!style="background-color: #BFB;"|13
|Yoshida IC
|Pref. Route 34 (Shimada Yoshida Route)
|style="text-align: center;"|185.6
|style="text-align: center;"|○
|
|Yoshida
|-
!style="background-color: #BFB;"|SA
|Makinohara SA/Bus Stop
|
|style="text-align: center;"|194.5
|style="text-align: center;"|○
|
|rowspan="2"|Makinohara
|-
!style="background-color: #BFB;"|13-1
|Sagara-Makinohara IC
| National Route 473
|style="text-align: center;"|197.0
|style="text-align: center;"|
|
|-
!style="background-color: #BFB;"|14
|Kikugawa IC
|Pref. Route 79 (Yoshida Daitō Route)
|style="text-align: center;"|201.8
|style="text-align: center;"|○
|
|Kikugawa
|-
!style="background-color: #BFB;"|14-1
|Kakegawa IC
|
|style="text-align: center;"|207.8
|style="text-align: center;"|○
|
|rowspan="3"|Kakegawa
|-
!style="background-color: #BFB;"|PA
|Ogasa PA
|
|style="text-align: center;"|209.7
|style="text-align: center;"|
|
|-
!style="background-color: #BFB;"|BS
|Okatsu Bus Stop
|
|style="text-align: center;"|212.9
|style="text-align: center;"|○
|
|-
!style="background-color: #BFB;"|15
|Fukuroi IC
|Pref. Route 61 (Hamakita Fukuroi Route)
|style="text-align: center;"|219.4
|style="text-align: center;"|○
|
|Fukuroi
|-
!style="background-color: #BFB;"|15-1
|Iwata IC
|Pref. Route 86 (Iwata Inter Route)Pref. Route 283 (Yokokawa Iwata Route)
|style="text-align: center;"|223.3
|style="text-align: center;"|
|Former site of Iwatahara PA
|rowspan="3"|Iwata
|-
!style="background-color: #BFB;"|PA(15-2)
|Enshū-Toyoda PA/SIC
|
|style="text-align: center;"|225.2
|style="text-align: center;"|
|
|-
!style="background-color: #BFB;"|BS
|Iwata Bus Stop
|
|style="text-align: center;"|226.2
|style="text-align: center;"|○
|
|-
!style="background-color: #BFB;"|16
|Hamamatsu IC
|Pref. Route 65 (Hamamatsu Kanjō Route)
|style="text-align: center;"|230.0
|style="text-align: center;"|
|
|rowspan="3"|Higashi-ku, Hamamatsu
|-
!style="background-color: #BFB;"|BS
|Hamamatsu-kita Bus Stop
|
|style="text-align: center;"|233.5
|style="text-align: center;"|○
|
|-
!style="background-color: #BFB;"|PA(16-1)
|Mikatagahara PA/SIC
|
|style="text-align: center;"|234.9
|style="text-align: center;"|
|
|-
!style="background-color: #BFB;"|16-2
|Hamamatsu-nishi IC
|Pref. Route 65 (Hamamatsu Kanjō Route)
|style="text-align: center;"|240.5
|style="text-align: center;"|
|
|rowspan="4"|Nishi-ku, Hamamatsu
|-
!style="background-color: #BFB;"|16-3
|Kanzanji SIC
|Pref. Route 320 (Inasa Kanzanji Route)Pref. Route 368 (Kotō kanzanji Route)
|style="text-align: center;"|244.7
|style="text-align: center;"|
|
|-
!style="background-color: #BFB;"|BS
|Kanzanji Bus Stop
|
|style="text-align: center;"|244.7
|style="text-align: center;"|○
|
|-
!rowspan="2" style="background-color: #BFB;"|BR
|rowspan="2" |Hamanako Bridge
|rowspan="2" |
|rowspan="2" style="text-align: center;"|↓
|rowspan="2" style="text-align: center;"|
|rowspan="2" |Length - 603 m
|-
|rowspan="7"|Kita-ku, Hamamatsu
|-
!style="background-color: #BFB;"|SA
|Hamanako SA
|
|style="text-align: center;"|247.9
|style="text-align: center;"|○
|
|-
!style="background-color: #BFB;"|17
|Mikkabi IC
|Pref. Route 85 (Mikkabi Inter Route)Pref. Route 308 (Hōrai Mikkabi Route)
|style="text-align: center;"|251.1
|style="text-align: center;"|
|
|-
!style="background-color: #BFB;"|TN
|Mikkabi Tunnel
|
|style="text-align: center;"|↓
|
|
|-
!style="background-color: #BFB;"|BS
|Mikkabi Bus Stop
|
|style="text-align: center;"|255.0
|style="text-align: center;"|○
|
|-
!style="background-color: #BFB;"|17-1
|Mikkabi JCT
| Shin-Tōmei Expressway
|style="text-align: center;"|255.8
|
|
|-
!rowspan="2" style="background-color: #BFB;"|TN
|rowspan="2" |Uri Tunnel
|rowspan="2" |
|rowspan="2" style="text-align: center;"|↓
|rowspan="2" style="text-align: center;"|
|rowspan="2" |
|-
|rowspan="2"|Shinshiro
|rowspan="26" style="width:1em;"|Aichi
|-
!style="background-color: #BFB;"|PA
|Shinshiro PA
|style="text-align: center;"|
|style="text-align: center;"|261.1
|
|-
!style="background-color: #BFB;"|BS
|Toyohashi-kita Bus Stop
|
|style="text-align: center;"|262.3
|style="text-align: center;"|○
|
|rowspan="2"|Toyohashi
|-
!style="background-color: #BFB;"|PA
|Toyohashi PA
|
|style="text-align: center;"|
|style="text-align: center;"|
|
|-
!style="background-color: #BFB;"|18
|Toyokawa IC
| National Route 151
|style="text-align: center;"|269.0
|style="text-align: center;"|○
|
|rowspan="4"|Toyokawa
|-
!style="background-color: #BFB;"|PA
|Akatsuka PA
|
|style="text-align: center;"|274.0
|style="text-align: center;"|
|
|-
!style="background-color: #BFB;"|BS
|Otowa Bus Stop
|
|style="text-align: center;"|279.1
|style="text-align: center;"|○
|
|-
!style="background-color: #BFB;"|18-1
|Otowa-Gamagōri IC
| National Route 1Otowa-Gamagōri Toll Road
|style="text-align: center;"|280.2
|style="text-align: center;"|
|
|-
!style="background-color: #BFB;"|BS
|Motojuku Bus Stop
|
|style="text-align: center;"|285.4
|style="text-align: center;"|○
|
|rowspan="5"|Okazaki
|-
!style="background-color: #BFB;"|PA
|Miai PA
|
|style="text-align: center;"|289.7
|style="text-align: center;"|
|
|-
!style="background-color: #BFB;"|19
|Okazaki IC
| National Route 1Pref. Route 26 (Okazaki Kanjō Route)
|style="text-align: center;"|293.4
|style="text-align: center;"|○
|
|-
!style="background-color: #BFB;"|-
|style="background-color:#ffdead;"|Okazaki-Achiwa SIC
|style="background-color:#ffdead;"|
|style="text-align: center; background-color:#ffdead;"|
|style="text-align: center; background-color:#ffdead;"|
|style="background-color:#ffdead;"|Planned
|-
!style="background-color: #BFB;"|BS
|Iwazu Bus Stop
|
|style="text-align: center;"|301.5
|style="text-align: center;"|○
|
|-
!style="background-color: #BFB;"|19-2
|Toyota JCT
| Isewangan Expressway
|style="text-align: center;"|304.1
|style="text-align: center;"|
|
|rowspan="3"|Toyota
|-
!style="background-color: #BFB;"|SA(19-3)
|Toyota-Kamigō SA/SIC
|Pref. Route 76 (Toyota Anjō Route)
|style="text-align: center;"|305.8
|style="text-align: center;"|○
|
|-
!style="background-color: #BFB;"|20
|Toyota IC
| National Route 155 (Toyota-minami Bypass)Pref. Route 76 (Toyota Anjō Route)
|style="text-align: center;"|310.8
|style="text-align: center;"|○
|
|-
!style="background-color: #BFB;"|20-1
|Tōmei-Miyoshi IC/Miyoshi Bus Stop
|Pref. Route 54 (Toyota Chiryū Route)
|style="text-align: center;"|315.8
|style="text-align: center;"|○
|
|Miyoshi
|-
!style="background-color: #BFB;"|PA
|Tōgō PA
|
|style="text-align: center;"|318.1
|style="text-align: center;"|
|
|rowspan="3"|Nisshin
|-
!style="background-color: #BFB;"|BS
|Nisshin Bus Stop
|
|style="text-align: center;"|319.3
|style="text-align: center;"|○
|
|-
!style="background-color: #BFB;"|20-2
|Nisshin JCT
| Nagoya-Seto Road
|style="text-align: center;"|322.3
|style="text-align: center;"|
|
|-
!style="background-color: #BFB;"|21
|Nagoya IC
| Mei-Nikan ExpresswayPref. Route 60 (Nagoya Nagakute Route)
|style="text-align: center;"|325.5
|style="text-align: center;"|
|
|Meitō-ku, Nagoya
|-
!style="background-color: #BFB;"|BS
|style="background-color:#CCC;"|Asahi Bus Stop
|style="background-color:#CCC;"|
|style="text-align: center; background-color:#CCC;"|329.5
|style="text-align: center; background-color:#CCC;"|X
|style="background-color:#CCC;"|Closed
|Owariasahi
|-
!style="background-color: #BFB;"|PA(21-1)
|Moriyama PA/SIC
|
|style="text-align: center;"|333.7
|style="text-align: center;"|
|
|Moriyama-ku, Nagoya
|-
!style="background-color: #BFB;"|22
|Kasugai IC
| National Route 19
|style="text-align: center;"|337.7
|style="text-align: center;"|X
|Bus Stop closed
|Kasugai
|-
!style="background-color: #BFB;"|23
|Komaki JCT
| Chūō Expressway
|style="text-align: center;"|339.9
|style="text-align: center;"|
|
|rowspan="2"|Komaki
|-
!style="background-color: #BFB;"|24
|Komaki IC
| Nagoya Expressway Komaki Route (via Komaki-kita Interchange) National Route 41
|style="text-align: center;"|346.8
|style="text-align: center;"|
|
|-
|colspan="8" style="text-align: center;"|Through to  Meishin Expressway

Lanes

 Sections with left and right routes formerly carried 2 lanes of traffic in each direction. An additional roadway (carrying 3 lanes of traffic in one direction only) has been constructed parallel to the existing 4 lanes to alleviate congestion. The original 4 lanes are then converted for the use of traffic in the opposite direction.

See also 
 Shin-Tōmei Expressway
 Asian Highway Network
 Central Nippon Expressway Company
 Expressways of Japan

References

External links 

Central Nippon Expressway Company

Expressways in Japan
AH1
Roads in Aichi Prefecture
Roads in Kanagawa Prefecture
Roads in Shizuoka Prefecture
Roads in Tokyo
1968 establishments in Japan